The Jamie Foxx Show is an American sitcom that aired on The WB from August 28, 1996, to January 14, 2001. The series stars Jamie Foxx, Garcelle Beauvais, Christopher B. Duncan, Ellia English, and Garrett Morris.

Although the show was not a major success with the ratings due to The WB being a relatively new network, the show did help launch Foxx's acting career while also relaunching Morris' career after his 1994 shooting. It also served as a launch pad for Beauvais who later starred in ABC's NYPD Blue.

Synopsis
Jamie King (Jamie Foxx) is an aspiring musician from Terrell, Texas, who has come to Los Angeles to pursue a career in entertainment. To support himself, he worked at his family's hotel, the financially strapped King's Tower, which is owned by his aunt and uncle, Aunt Helen and Uncle Junior King (Ellia English and Garrett Morris).

Among his co-workers during the series' run were the beautiful and intelligent front desk clerk Francesca "Fancy" Monroe (Garcelle Beauvais) and Jamie's high-strung, stuffed-shirt, "bourgeois" nemesis Braxton P. Hartnabrig (Christopher B. Duncan) who works as an accountant for the King's Tower.

Jamie's romantic overtures toward Fancy were mostly unrequited until the final two seasons, when the two began to tentatively date and eventually became engaged and finally married. Braxton, who generally served as the brunt of Jamie's insults, was known to get in a few digs of his own as the series progressed - eventually becoming Jamie's best friend and, at one point, roommate.

Cast and characters
 Jamie Foxx as James "Jamie" Percy King
 Garcelle Beauvais as Francesca Danielle "Fancy" Monroe
 Christopher B. Duncan as Braxton P. Hartnabrig
 Ellia English as Aunt Helen King
 Garrett Morris as Uncle Junior King
 Andy Berman as Dennis, the bellboy (season 1, episodes 1–12)

Recurring
 Orlando Brown as Nelson (seasons 1–3)
 Suli McCullough as Mouse (seasons 4–5)
 Alex Thomas as Phil (seasons 4–5)
 Gladys Knight (season 1, episode 22, and season 5, episode 12) and Jo Marie Payton (season 3, episode 7) as Janice King, Jamie's mother 
 Sherri Shepherd as Sheila Yarborough (seasons 4–5)
 Chris Spencer as Curtis (season 4)
 Susan Wood as Cameron (season 3)
 Alan F. Smith as Silas (season 3)
 Blake Clark as Bob Nelson (season 4)
 Kellita Smith as Cherise (seasons 2–3)
 Rhona Bennett as Nicole Evans (season 4)
 Karen Maruyama as Gloria (seasons 4–5)
 Billy Davis Jr. and Marilyn McCoo as William and Joan Monroe, Fancy's parents (season 5)
 Scott Atkinson as Hawkins (season 4, episodes 4, 14, 18, and 22)
 Gerald LeVert as Charles Young, Jamie's stepfather (season 3, episode 7, and season 5, episode 12)

Episodes

Reruns and syndication
The series aired in broadcast syndication distributed by Telepictures Distribution and Warner Bros. Domestic Television Distribution which reruns on CBS, Fox, UPN, and The WB or independent affiliates from 2000 to 2001. The series had reran weeknights at 7:00pm EST on New York City's local UPN's affiliation WWOR-TV replacing In the House until Fall 2003, when it was replaced with reruns of The King of Queens. Reruns of the series also aired on BET from 2005 to 2008 and started airing once again September 2009 to 2016, and as part of The CW Television Network's The CW Daytime (along with reruns of The Wayans Bros.) block from September 2008 to September 2009. As of the 2010s, reruns also air on Centric, VH1 and MTV2 (until 2020, but as of 2020/2021 only MTV2 shows reruns of the series late nights). In Jamaica, the series aired on both major stations Television Jamaica and CVM Television. In Canada, the series aired on The Comedy Network, a Canadian specialty channel, and then, Much.

Several episodes of The Jamie Foxx Show were also available on AOL's In2TV, which allowed Internet users to watch streamed or download high resolution episodes of various favorite classics. Since Time Warner's June 2009 announcement that it would split from America Online, the episodes have been moved over to AOL Video.

On November 1, 2021, all episodes of The Jamie Foxx Show were made available for streaming on HBO Max.

Home media
Warner Home Video released season one of The Jamie Foxx Show on DVD in Region 1 on February 8, 2005.

Warner Archive has subsequently released seasons 2–4 on DVD. These are Manufacture-on-Demand (MOD) releases, available from Warner's online store and Amazon.com.

In popular culture 
American producer Pi'erre Bourne used a clip from an early episode in the show as a producer tag, "Yo Pi'erre, you wanna come out here?" Most notably featured in the 2017 hit song Magnolia by American rapper Playboi Carti.

References

External links
 

1996 American television series debuts
1990s American black sitcoms
2001 American television series endings
2000s American black sitcoms
English-language television shows
Television series by Warner Bros. Television Studios
Television series created by Jamie Foxx
Television series set in hotels
Television shows set in Los Angeles
The WB original programming